Reidsville High School is a public high school located in Reidsville, North Carolina, serving students in the ninth through twelfth grade. It is in the Rockingham County Schools school district.

History 
Reidsville High School was established in 1923, with the construction of the former Reidsville High School. The location of the current school opened in 1960, as Reidsville Senior High School. In 1999, the name was changed to Reidsville High School.

Football team 
As of 2021, Reidsville High School's football team holds 23 state championships, the most of any school in North Carolina.

Notable alumni 
 Scott Bankhead, former MLB pitcher; silver medalist in Men's Baseball at the 1984 Summer Olympics
 Na Brown, former NFL wide receiver with the Philadelphia Eagles
 Mike Goodes, professional golfer
 Richard S. Ritchie, U.S. Air Force officer
 Nick Sacrinty, former NFL quarterback
 Jerome Simpson, former NFL wide receiver with the Cincinnati Bengals, Minnesota Vikings, and San Francisco 49ers
 Melvin Watkins, college basketball coach

References

External links 
 

Public high schools in North Carolina
Schools in Rockingham County, North Carolina
Educational institutions established in 1960